This list of unusual deaths includes unique or extremely rare circumstances of death recorded throughout history, noted as being unusual by multiple sources.

Antiquity

Middle Ages

Renaissance

Early modern period

19th century

20th century

1901–1960 
{| class="wikitable"
|-
!scope="col" | Name of person
!scope="col" | Image
!scope="col" | Date of death
!scope="col" | Details
|-
!scope="row" | Stanton Walker
|
| 25 October 1902
| The 20-year-old Walker was watching an amateur baseball game in Morristown, Ohio, with a friend on either side of him. One of the friends borrowed a knife from the other to sharpen his pencil as he was keeping score, and when he was finished passed the knife to Walker to pass to the other friend. As Walker was holding the knife, a foul ball struck him in the hand and drove the knife into his chest next to his heart. His friends asked if he was hurt and he said "not much", but the wound soon began to bleed heavily and he died within minutes.    
|-
! Unknown (♂)
|
|  Early 1903
| An unnamed person was beaten to death with a Bible during a healing ceremony gone wrong in Honolulu, Hawai'i. He was being treated for malaria when his family summoned a Kahuna, who decided he was possessed by devils and tried to exorcise the demons; the Kahuna was charged with manslaughter.
|-
!Benjamin Taylor A Bell
|
|1 March 1904
|On 18 February 1904, while taking his habitual shortcut to the Canadian Mining Review offices through an adjacent store, Canadian journalist Benjamin Taylor A Bell walked through the wrong door in the store and fell  down an elevator shaft. He died of his injuries on 1 March.
|-
!John Mortensen
|
|1 May 1904
|-
!Melissa M. Tiemann
|
|7 July 1904
|50-year-old Melissa Tiemann of Los Angeles, California, fell from a streetcar and struck the back of her head on the ground, driving the teeth of an aluminum comb she was wearing into her skull.
|-
!George Spencer Millet
|
|15 February 1909
|George Millet, an American teenager who worked as an office boy at an insurance company at the Metropolitan Life Building in New York City, was fleeing six young women stenographers at his workplace intent on giving him kisses for his 15th birthday while carrying an ink eraser in his breast pocket. As the women moved in for their kisses, he fell forward, and the eraser's point pierced his heart, killing him.
|-
!Doc Powers
|
|26 April 1909
|Baseball player Michael Riley "Doc" Powers, 38, ran into a wall while chasing a foul ball during a game at Philadelphia's Shibe Park, on April 12, 1909. He died from internal injuries two weeks later.
|-
!Franz Reichelt
|
|4 February 1912
|Franz Reichelt, a tailor and inventor, leaped from the Eiffel Tower and fell to his death wearing a parachute made from cloth, his own invention. He was asked by friends and authorities to use a dummy for the feat, but declined, saying "I intend to prove the worth of my invention". Reichelt is known as the Flying Tailor.
|-
!Julian Carlton
|
|7 October 1914
|Carlton, who was a servant to the American architect Frank Lloyd Wright, committed a mass murder spree on August 15, 1914, at Wright's Taliesin studio, during which he killed 7 people with a hatchet and set the studio ablaze. Carlton then attempted suicide by drinking hydrochloric acid. However, this failed to kill him. After nearly being lynched, Carlton was arrested and brought to a jail in Dodgeville, Wisconsin, where, having severely damaged his esophagus, he starved to death forty-seven days later.
|-
!scope="row" | Grigori Rasputin
| 
|  30December [O.S.17December] 1916
| The Russian mystic died of three gunshot wounds, one of which was a close-range shot to his forehead. Little is certain about his death beyond this, and the circumstances of his death have been the subject of considerable speculation. According to his murderer himself, Prince Felix Yusupov, Grigori Rasputin consumed tea, cakes, and wine which had been laced with cyanide but he did not appear to be affected by it. He was then shot once in the chest and believed to be dead but, after a while, he leapt up and attacked Yusupov, who freed himself and fled. Rasputin followed and made it into the courtyard before being shot again, and collapsing into a snowbank. The conspirators then wrapped his body and dropped it into the Malaya Nevka River.
|-
!scope="row" | Victims of the Great Molasses Flood
| 
| 
| Twenty-one people were killed and 150 injured in the Great Molasses Flood, when a large tank of molasses burst in Boston's North End.
|-
!scope="row" | Ray Chapman
| 
| 
| On August 16, 1920, while he was up to bat, Cleveland Indians baseball player Ray Chapman, 29, was struck in the head by a pitch thrown by New York Yankees' Carl Mays and died 12 hours later. He is the only player in Major League Baseball history to have died as a direct result of an on-field injury.<ref>{{cite news |url=https://books.google.com/books?id=MiwDAAAAMBAJ&pg=PA9 |title=Carl Mays: My Pitch That Killed Chapman Was A Strike! |last=Propert |first=Phyllis |work=Baseball Digest |date=July 1957 |volume=16 |number=6 |issn=0005-609X}}</ref>
|-
!scope="row" | Alexander of Greece
| 
| 
| King Alexander of Greece, 27, died of sepsis after being bitten by a palace steward's pet Barbary macaque in his garden, while trying to break up a fight between his German shepherd and another monkey.
|-
!scope="row" | George Herbert, 5th Earl of Carnarvon
| 
| 
| George Herbert, 5th Earl of Carnarvon, who financed Howard Carter's search for Tutankhamun, died after a mosquito bite, which he had cut while shaving, became infected. Some attributed his death to the so-called curse of the pharaohs.
|-
!scope="row" | Frank Hayes
|
| 
| Frank Hayes, 22, a jockey of Elmont, New York, died of a heart attack mid-race and collapsed on the horse, which nonetheless crossed the finish line first, still carrying his body.
|-
!scope="row" | Martha Mansfield
| 
|
| While American film actress Martha Mansfield, 24, was on location in San Antonio, Texas filming the American Civil War drama The Warrens of Virginia, a lit match was carelessly tossed by a crew member, which ignited the hoop skirts and ruffles of her Civil War costume. Mansfield had just finished filming her scenes and retired to a car when her clothing burst into flames. Co-star Wilfred Lytell and a chauffeur were able to extinguish the flames, and Mansfield was rushed to a hospital, where she died the following day from her injuries.
|-
!scope="row" | Thornton Jones
|
| 
| Thornton Jones, a lawyer in Bangor, Gwynedd, Wales, woke up to find that he had his throat slit. Motioning for a paper and pencil, he wrote, "I dreamt that I had done it. I awoke to find it true," and died 80 minutes later. He had done it himself while unconscious. An inquest at Bangor delivered a verdict of "suicide while temporarily insane".
|-
!scope="row" | Calvin Coolidge Jr.
|
| 
| Calvin Coolidge Jr., 16, the younger son of Calvin Coolidge, played tennis with his elder brother at the White House tennis courts, and neglected to wear socks. A blister on the third toe of his right foot resulted which quickly became infected, and he died just over one week later when sepsis set in.
|-
!scope="row" | Bobby Leach
|
| 
| Bobby Leach, an American stunt performer, died after a botched amputation of the infected leg which he had broken after slipping on an orange peel. He had gone over Niagara Falls in a barrel fifteen years earlier.
|-
!scope="row" | Phillip McClean
|
| 
| Phillip McClean, 16, and his brother were clubbing a cassowary on the family property in Mossman, Queensland, when it knocked him down, kicked him in the neck, and opened a large cut, leading to death from loss of blood.
|-
!scope="row" | Isadora Duncan
| 
| 
| Isadora Duncan, an American dancer, broke her neck in Nice, France when her long scarf became entangled in the open-spoked wheel and rear axle of the Amilcar CGSS automobile in which she was riding.
|-
!scope="row" |Nicholas Comper
|
| 
| Nicholas Comper, an aviator and aircraft designer, was attempting to light a firework in Hythe, Kent, when a passerby enquired what he was doing; Comper replied that he was an IRA man planning to blow up the town hall. The passerby knocked down Comper, who hit his head on the curb.
|-
!scope="row" | Sherwood Anderson
| 
| 
| Sherwood Anderson, an American writer, died of peritonitis after accidentally swallowing a toothpick.
|-
!scope="row" | Clarence Stagemyer 
|
|  
| Stagemyer, 32, was watching a Cleveland Indians-Washington Senators doubleheader in Griffith Stadium when an errant throw by Senators' third baseman Sherry Robertson struck him in the forehead. Despite appearing uninjured afterwards, he heeded the Senators' team physician's entreaties to go to the hospital, where he died the next day of a fractured skull. Stagemyer was the first fan in Major League Baseball history killed by a ball leaving the field, and the only such fatality to date to have been struck by a thrown ball. 
|-
!scope="row" | Thomas Midgley Jr.
|
| 
| In 1940, at the age of 51, Midgley contracted polio, which left him severely disabled. He devised an elaborate system of ropes and pulleys to lift himself out of bed. In 1944, he became entangled in the device and died of strangulation.
|-
!scope="row" | Thomas Mantell
| 
| 
| Thomas Mantell, the pilot of a P-51 Mustang fighter plane, crashed while in pursuit of an unidentified flying object near the town of Franklin, Kentucky, thus becoming the first person known to have died as a result of a UFO sighting. Officially, the object remains unidentified, though the most likely explanation is that it was a U. S. Navy Skyhook balloon.
|-
!scope="row" | Mary Reeser
| 
| 
| Mary Reeser was found by the police in her St. Petersburg, Florida home almost totally cremated where she sat, while her apartment was relatively damage-free. Some speculate that she spontaneously combusted.
|-
!Margaret Wise Brown
|
|13 November 1952
|Margaret Wise Brown, 42, author of Goodnight Moon, had been previously admitted to the hospital for an ovarian cyst. To prove how healthy she was after treatment, she kicked her foot in the air, dislodging a blood clot in her leg. The blood clot quickly travelled to her brain, and she died in emergency surgery.
|-
!scope="row" | Gareth Jones
|
| 
| Gareth Jones, a British actor, died of a heart attack between scenes of a live television play, Underground on the ITV network in the UK. Other members of the cast improvised lines, such as, "I'm sure if So‑and‑so were here he would say...", to compensate for his absence. Coincidentally, his character was scripted to die of a heart attack in a later scene of the play.
|}

 1960s 

 1970s 

 1980s 

 1990s 

 21st century 
 2000s 

 2010s 

 2020s 

Animal deaths

This section is for the deaths of animals, for whom there are several sources mentioning the deaths as unusual.

 See also 

 Autoerotic fatality
 Darwin Awards
 Death by coconut
 Death from laughter
 Execution by elephant
 Spontaneous human combustion
 1000 Ways to Die Death during consensual sex

Lists

 List of association footballers who died while playing
 List of causes of death by rate
 List of racing cyclists and pacemakers with a cycling-related death
 List of entertainers who died during a performance
 List of inventors killed by their own invention
 List of last words
 Lists of people by cause of death
 List of people who died on the toilet
 List of people executed for witchcraft
 Lists of people who disappeared
 List of political self-immolations
 List of selfie-related injuries and deaths
 Toilet-related injuries and deaths
 

 References 

Works cited

 Further reading 
 
 
 
 Dreher, Dale. ebook Death by Misadventure: 210 Dumb Ways to Die. 
 John Dunning Strange Deaths'' (true crime)

External links 
 Curious and Unusual Deaths Pictures. Discovery Channel.
 Freakish Fatalities Snopes.com

Death-related lists
Lists of people by cause of death
Deaths